Lambert Schaus (18 January 1908 – 10 August 1976) was a Luxembourg politician, jurist, and diplomat. He held office as a government minister and European Commissioner.

Schaus was born in Luxembourg City to a jeweller.  He studied jurisprudence in Paris, and also in Bonn for one term. In 1932 Schaus was appointed as a lawyer at the Luxembourgish court of appeal. Prior to the Second World War Schaus was active in local politics as a Luxembourg town councillor.  When Schaus refused to support the occupation of Luxembourg by Germany, he was arrested in 1941 by the Gestapo and interned in a labour camp where he worked to build motorways.  Later he was made an office assistant in the district administration office of Cochem and was later stationed in labour camps in the Sudetenland and Black Forest areas.

On returning to Luxembourg after the war he became economy and army minister in the government of Pierre Dupong in August 1946, representing the CSV party.  He was responsible for the difficult reconstruction and for the first standing army of the Grand Duchy.  In July 1948 Schaus left the government and again became Luxembourg town councillor until 1952.  From 1952 he became a special envoy, and from 1955, ambassador to Belgium, based in Brussels. In this role he was significantly involved in the development of European integration and led the Luxembourg delegation negotiating the formation of the European Economic Community and Euratom.

On 18 June 1958 Schaus was appointed Luxembourg's representative on the inaugural European Commission, the Hallstein Commission, to replace the recently deceased Michel Rasquin.  Schaus had responsibility for the Transport portfolio. He strove in particular for a common traffic policy among the EEC states as well as opening of the national markets for traffic and transport enterprises from other states. He was re-appointed to the second Hallstein commission in 1962 and served until 1967.  He was succeeded by Victor Bodson.

|-

|-

|-

1908 births
1976 deaths
Alumni of the Athénée de Luxembourg
Ambassadors of Luxembourg to Belgium
Christian Social People's Party politicians
Councillors in Luxembourg City
Luxembourgian diplomats
Luxembourgian European Commissioners
20th-century Luxembourgian lawyers
Members of the Council of State of Luxembourg
Ministers for Defence of Luxembourg
People from Luxembourg City
Permanent Representatives of Luxembourg to NATO